Phou Khao Khouay National Biodiversity Conservation Area is a protected area in Laos. It is located 40 kilometres (25 mi) northeast of Vientiane. It was established on 29 October 1993 covering an area of 2,000 km2 extending into Xaisomboun Province, Vientiane Prefecture, Vientiane Province, and Bolikhamsai Province. It includes a large stretch of mountain range with sandstone cliffs, river gorges and three large rivers with tributaries which flow into the Mekong River. 

It has mountainous topography with elevation varying from 200 m – 1761 m. The area emerged from "uplifting and exposure of the underlying sedimentary (Indosinias schist-clay-sandstone) complex". Sandstones are also seen spread in layers. Extensive flat uplands with sandstones with hardly any soil cover are also part of the topography of the park. 

The park has monsoonal climate with recorded annual rainfall of 1,936.1 mm (with higher reaches recording more rainfall). The mean annual temperature is 26.6 °C with recorded the mean maximum of 31.6 °C and the mean minimum temperature of 21.5 °C. 

The forests are evergreen, Shorea mixed deciduous forest, dry dipterocarp and pine type; particularly coniferous forest, of mono specific stands of Pinus merkusii, Fokienia hodgsinsii, bamboo, and fire-climax grasslands. 

Animals found in the park include elephants, tigers, bears, 13 pairs of white-cheeked gibbons, langurs, reptiles, amphibians and birds. Sightings of the green peafowl have been reported near Ban Nakhay and Ban Nakhan Thoung, although it was generally once considered extinct in Laos. Conservation management has increased its population.

See also
Protected areas of Laos

References

National Biodiversity Conservation Areas
Geography of Bolikhamsai province
Geography of Vientiane province
Protected areas established in 1993
1993 in Laos